Marcus Saltau  (17 June 1869 – 21 July 1945) was an Australian politician.

He was born in Warrnambool to German-born carrier Henry Saltau and Annie McKenzie. He attended state school and followed his father into the produce trade, eventually becoming manager of the family firm. On 4 April 1893 he married Jean Buick Anton, with whom he had two children; he would later marry Margaret Hilda Humphries in 1927. From 1899 to 1913 he served on Warrnambool Town Council, of which he was mayor from 1910 to 1912. In 1924 he won a by-election for Western Province in the Victorian Legislative Council, representing the Nationalist Party. He was a minister without portfolio from 1928 to 1929 and again for two months in 1935. Denied United Australia Party preselection in 1940, he was lost his seat running as an independent. He was appointed a Commander of the Order of the British Empire in 1945. Saltau died in Toorak in 1945.

References

1869 births
1945 deaths
Nationalist Party of Australia members of the Parliament of Victoria
United Australia Party members of the Parliament of Victoria
Independent members of the Parliament of Victoria
Members of the Victorian Legislative Council
Australian Commanders of the Order of the British Empire